Wickham Island  is located in the Recherche Archipelago off the south coast of Western Australia.

References

Recherche Archipelago